Neopempelia is a monotypic snout moth genus described by Hans Georg Amsel in 1954. Its only species, Neopempelia hieroglyphella, was described by Émile Louis Ragonot in 1887. It is found in Russia.

References

Pyralidae genera
Phycitinae
Monotypic moth genera
Moths of Europe
Taxa named by Hans Georg Amsel